Changyou may refer to:

Sing and Play, a 1998 Mandopop album by Faye Wong
 Changyou.com, a Chinese internet company